Košarkaški klub Igokea, commonly referred to as KK Igokea or as Igokea m:tel due to sponsorship reasons, is a Bosnian professional basketball club based in Aleksandrovac near Laktaši, Republika Srpska, Bosnia and Herzegovina. The club plays in the Adriatic League, the Bosnian League and the Champions League. The club is a founding member and shareholder of the Adriatic Basketball Association.

History 
Even though they have become well known to the broader basketball public in the territory of the former Yugoslavia only several years ago, when they joined the regional competition called the Adriatic League, Igokea is a club with a long-lasting tradition. Its beginnings go back into 23 July 1973, when KK Potkozarje was established in Aleksandrovac by a group of enthusiasts that set themselves the main goal to introduce basketball to local youth and teach them the basics. In the second half of the 1990s, the club was renamed to Igokea and that's when the club's main emphasis was put on its youth categories and got another dimension and adopted the highest ambitions at the senior level. The Igokea's first trophy came in 2001 when the club from Aleksandrovac conquered the entire competition in Bosnia and Herzegovina and became champion. Six years later, it won its first national cup trophy. By now the club has won six championship and five cup trophies. In the 2010–11 season, Igokea participated in the ABA League for the first time and in 2013 it reached the regional league's final four tournaments, securing themselves also a spot in the Eurocup and that's when it entered the biggest international stage.

2012–13 ABA League controversy
At the beginning of the 2012–13 ABA League season, the ABA League Board announced that starting this season the only way to qualify for the European Club Competitions under ULEB, will be through Adriatic League and not the national championships of each ABA country member. ABA League Board also informed clubs and the public that the winner of the regular season will directly qualify for the Euroleague Group Phase in the 2013–14 season and that the second ABA team in Euroleague will be the Final Four winner. If the same team wins the regular season and the Final Four, then the second-placed team from the regular season will go to Euroleague. The third-placed team from the regular season would enter the Qualification for the 2013–14 Euroleague. In February 2013, when it became clear that Igokea will win the regular season, Euroleague Basketball clarified the situation of the Adriatic League spots saying the three first teams in the Final Four will qualify. Due to the different interpretations of both associations, Euroleague and Liga ABA negotiated a solution to be applied only for the 2012–13 season.
Finally, both organizations agreed that if the team is in the first positions after the Regular Season meets all of the B-licence minimum requirements, will qualify to Euroleague. In this case, KK Igokea doesn't meet the required criteria, so Euroleague Basketball applied the 2012-13 Euroleague Bylaws by which the 2013 ABA Final Four champion and the runner-up will take the first two Adriatic positions in this order, whilst the next highest regular-season team will take the final Adriatic position.

2013–14 European Club Competitions
On 25 June 2013, the Igokea's Executive Board announced that the club won't compete in the 2013–14 Euroleague Qualifying rounds because their home arena doesn't meet the standards for the Euroleague B license (mainly because of the capacity). Instead, the club competed in the 2013–14 EuroCup.

Sponsorship naming
KK Igokea has had several names through the years due to its sponsorship:

Home arena

Igokea plays its home games at the Laktaši Sports Hall. The hall is located in Laktaši. The small hall has a seating capacity of 3,050 seats.

Players

Retired numbers

Current roster

Depth chart

Head coaches 

  Jovica Antonić (2000–2001)
  Drago Karalić (2001)
  Dragan Kostić (2006–2007)
  Željko Lukajić (2007)
  Miodrag Kadija (2007)
  Zoran Sretenović (2007–2008)
  Drago Karalić (2008)
  Predrag Badnjarević (2008)
  Dragan Bajić (2008)
  Drago Karalić (2009–2010)
  Slobodan Klipa (2010–2011)
  Dragan Bajić (2011–2013)
  Milutin Latinčić (2013–2014)
  Vladimir Jovanović (2014)
  Željko Lukajić (2014–2015)
  Dragan Bajić (2015–2018)
  Žarko Milaković (2018)
  Nenad Trajković (2018)
  Žarko Milaković (2018)
  Dragan Nikolić (2018–2019)
  Aleksandar Trifunović  (2019)
  Dragan Bajić (2019–2023)
  Vladimir Jovanović (2023–present)

Honours

Domestic competitions
 Bosnian Championship
Winners (8): 2000–01, 2012–13, 2013–14, 2014–15, 2015–16, 2016–17, 2019–20, 2021–22
 Bosnian Cup
Winners (10): 2007, 2013, 2015, 2016, 2017, 2018, 2019, 2021, 2022, 2023

Entity competitions
 Republika Srpska First League (second tier)
Winners (2): 1999–00, 2000–01
 Republika Srpska Cup
Winners (11): 1999–00, 2000–01, N/A, 2007–08, 2009–10, 2010–11, 2011–12, 2012–13, 2013–14, 2014–15, 2020–21

International record

Management 
Current officeholders are:
 President:  Boris Spasojević
 General manager:  Darko Čubrilović
 Sports director:  Vuk Radivojević
 Team manager:  Siniša Kovačević

References

External links

  
 KK Igokea at abaliga.com
 KK Igokea at EuroBasket.com

 
Igokea
Basketball teams established in 1973
Basketball teams in Yugoslavia